Hogg Life Vol. 4: American King (shortened as American King) is the eighth solo studio album by American rapper Slim Thug. It was released on August 5, 2016, through Hogg Life, serving as the fourth installment of the rapper's Hogg Life album series. Production was handled by Mr. Lee, G Luck, B Don, Donnie Houston, DJ Grim, Cy Fyre and June James. It features guest appearances from Boosie Badazz, Nikki Lactson and XO On The Beat. The album peaked at number 179 on the US Billboard 200.

AllMusic's Neil Z. Yeung wrote: "with his distinctive deep voice, [Slim] Thug incorporates laid-back contemporary production atop his usual Dirty South-meets-G-Funk sound".

Music videos were directed for "King", "Enemy", "Wanna B Heard", "Real" and "Peaceful".

Track listing

Personnel 
 Stayve "Slim Thug Thomas – main artist, executive producer
 Torrence "Boosie Badazz" Hatch – featured artist (tracks: 7, 11)
 XO On The Beat – featured artist (track 8)
 Nikki Lactson – featured artist (track 15)
 DJ Grim – producer (track 1)
 Leroy "Mr. Lee" Williams – producer (tracks: 2-4, 14, 15)
 Gavin "G Luck" Luckett – producer (tracks: 8, 13)
 Brandon "B Don" Pitre – producer (tracks: 8, 13)
 Dondric "Donnie Houston" Joseph – producer (tracks: 9, 10)
 June James – producer (track 11)
 Cy Fyre – producer (track 12)
 Christian "CQ" Quinonez – mixing (tracks: 9, 10)
 Greg Noire – photography

Charts

References

External links 
 

2016 albums
Slim Thug albums